Andreia Alexandra Norton (born 15 August 1996) is a Portuguese footballer who plays as a forward for Benfica in the Campeonato Nacional de Futebol Feminino. She first played for her country in an under nineteen match in 2012 and debuted for the senior team four years later.

Career

Club
Norton started to play football at the age of two in her native city. When Norton was seven, she went to play for the "Furadouro Sports Club", an amateur club in Ovar, where she was the only girl in the team. She used to play as a defender, then she started to play in the midfield and finally settled down as a forward. At the age of 12, she was forced to leave the team, because Portuguese law forbids mixed teams above the age of 12. In 2009, aged 13, Norton went to play for U.D. Oliveirense, at that time a team playing in the Portuguese First Division. Due to her young age she only played a few matches, but scored a goal against Leixões S.C. U.D. Oliveirense was relegated that season, and later folded. Like most players from Oliveirense, she went to F.C. Cesarense, where she spent three years. In 2013, Norton signed with Clube de Albergaria. There, she was twice voted the league's best player, at 17 and 18 years of age.

In 2015, Norton was offered a contract with FC Barcelona. In one of the final matches of the season, against Club de Albergaria, she suffered a serious injury in her left knee, which forced her to undergo surgery twice. As the contract with Barcelona was already signed, she went to Catalonia but was unable to play any matches for the club. After one year in Spain, she decided to return to Portugal and signed with S.C. Braga in order to get more playing time and therefore recover her previous form. On 19 March 2018 Norton was included by the "Quinas de Ouro" award among the "11 Best Players" in the Portuguese women's league. The award is annually organized by the Portuguese Football Federation together with the "Associação Nacional dos Treinadores de Futebol" and the "Sindicato dos Jogadores Profissionais de Futebol".

In May 2018, German Frauen-Bundesliga club SC Sand announced that they had signed Norton.

In August 2019, Italian club Inter Milan announced that they had signed Norton.

On 13 February 2020 Portuguese club Sporting Clube de Braga announced the come back of Norton after her departure in 2018 after 2 years in the portuguese club.

On 1 July 2022 Portuguese club Sport Lisboa e Benfica announced the signing of Norton with a contract until 2025.

International
Norton debuted for Portugal U19 in a match against Wales U19 on 13 March 2012. She was part of the team that reached the semi-finals in the 2012 UEFA Women's Under-19 Championship, when they lost 1–0 against Spain in the semi-finals. Norton played with the U19 team until 2015, recording 25 caps with nine goals scored. On 15 October 2016, at the age of 20, Norton debuted for the Portuguese senior team in a tie against Romania. In her debut she scored the goal that enabled Portugal to qualify for a European Women's Championship for the first time. , this is Norton's only international goal. On 6 July 2017 Francisco Neto asked Norton to represent Portugal at the UEFA Women's Euro 2017. She did not play any matches as Portugal was eliminated in the group stage.

Personal life
Norton is the daughter of journeyman Brazilian footballer, Valdecir Ribeiro da Silva (known as "Pingo"), who played for A.D. Ovarense in the 1995/1996 season. She never met her father, and was raised by her grandmother, aunt, and uncle.

Honours

Benfica
 Supertaça de Portugal: 2022
Braga
 Taça de Portugal: 2019–20
 Taça da Liga: 2021–22

References

External links
 
 
 
 Player's Profile at S.C. Braga
 

1996 births
Living people
Andreia Norton
Andreia Norton
Women's association football forwards
Campeonato Nacional de Futebol Feminino players
S.C. Braga (women's football) players
FC Barcelona Femení players
Primera División (women) players
Expatriate women's footballers in Spain
Expatriate women's footballers in Germany
Frauen-Bundesliga players
SC Sand players
Inter Milan (women) players
Portuguese expatriate sportspeople in Spain
Portuguese expatriate sportspeople in Germany
People from Ovar
Portuguese people of Brazilian descent
Clube de Albergaria players
Sportspeople from Aveiro District
UEFA Women's Euro 2022 players
UEFA Women's Euro 2017 players